Paruthippally CSI Church, part of the Church of South India (CSI) is one of the oldest congregation in South India having historical importance in Travancore state. The church was constructed during the period of His Highness Swathi Thirunal Rama Varma  . The Paruthippally church was built with the leadership of Rev. John Cox London Missionary Society in Kerala. This church is a heritage site in Kuttichal.

Festivals
The important festivals are Passion Week, Good Friday, Easter,
Christmas and New Year.

During December, which is considered as the Holy Month, the church is fully decorated with stars and lights and festive celebrations and activities are being conducted. Which is the biggest fest of the year.

References

Church of South India church buildings in India
Churches in Thiruvananthapuram district